Hwang Kyo-ahn  (born 15 April 1957) is a South Korean politician and prosecutor who served as acting president of South Korea from 9 December 2016 to 10 May 2017 and the 40th prime minister of South Korea from 18 June 2015 to 11 May 2017.

Hwang served as Minister of Justice from 2013 to 2015 under President Park Geun-hye. He played a leading role in the investigation into the 2013 South Korean sabotage plot, which led to the conviction of Lee Seok-ki and the dissolution of the Unified Progressive Party. In May 2015, he was nominated by President Park Geun-hye for the position of Prime Minister of South Korea and assumed office on June 18, 2015.

On December 9, 2016, President Park Geun-hye was impeached by the National Assembly. Hwang assumed the role of Acting President of Korea in accordance with the presidential order of succession until the election of Moon Jae-in on 9 May 2017.

In January 2019, he joined the Liberty Korea Party, and was elected as its party leader on 27 February 2019. When the Liberty Korea Party merged with several other parties to form the United Future Party on 17 February 2020, Hwang continued his role of party leader of the United Future Party. After leading the United Future Party to a landslide defeat in the 2020 South Korean legislative election and losing his own election for the constituency in Jongno District, Seoul, Hwang resigned as party leader.

On 10 March 2021, Hwang announced his candidacy for nominee of the People Power Party in the 2022 South Korean presidential election. He was eliminated from the shortlist of PPP candidates on 8 October.

Early life and education
Hwang was born on April 15, 1957. He graduated from Kyunggi High School in 1976. He received his LL.B in 1981 from the College of Law at Sungkyunkwan University, and passed the 23rd National Bar Exam the same year. Hwang managed to avoid the mandatory military service which all Korean male adults are required to complete by claiming a rare case of hives.

Hwang earned his LL.M. in 2006 from the Graduate School of Law at Sungkyunkwan University.

Prosecutorial career
Hwang was a career prosecutor. In December 1982, he began his career as prosecutor at the Chuncheon District Prosecutor's Office. He worked as a public security inspector with the Supreme Public Prosecutors' Office and the Seoul District Public Prosecutor's Office. He spent 30 years as a prosecutor, specializing in enforcing public safety and national security laws under the military junta of Chun Doo-hwan, gaining particular notoriety for targeting democracy activists by linking them with North Korea.

Hwang wrote a book on the national security law called the "Public Security Investigation Textbook."

After serving as the Chief Inspector of the Busan High Prosecutors' Office in 2011, he served as an attorney at the Pacific Law Firm from September 2011 to January 2013.

Political career

Justice Minister (2013–2015)
Hwang joined the Cabinet of South Korean President Park Geun-hye in 2013 as minister of justice. In that role, Hwang played a key role in the Constitutional Court case against the left-wing Unified Progressive Party (which was accused of holding pro-North Korean views); the case culminated in a controversial December 2014 order banning the party, a decision that some saw as a blow to freedom of speech in South Korea.

Prime Minister (2015–2017) 
On May 21, 2015, Park named Hwang as Prime Minister of South Korea, following the resignation of Lee Wan-koo due to allegations of bribery.

In July 2016, Hwang was heckled and pelted with eggs and water bottles by crowds in the rural town of Seongju, who were opposed to deployment of the Terminal High Altitude Area Defense (a U.S. missile defense system) in the area. The deployment plans angered local residents, who raised health and environmental concerns.

Hwang "was regarded as the staunchest loyalist in Park's cabinet." Nevertheless, on November 2, 2016, one month before her impeachment, Park fired Hwang as Prime Minister amid the 2016 South Korean political scandal as Park tried to rebuild confidence in her administration. However, after "a dispute with opposition leaders over choosing a replacement," Hwang was kept in office as prime minister.

Afterwards, Hwang attended the APEC meeting, which was held in Peru, on behalf of Park.

Acting President (2016–2017) 

On December 9, 2016, upon the National Assembly's vote to impeach President Park following a political scandal, Hwang assumed Park's presidential powers and duties as Acting President. On March 10, 2017, South Korea's Constitutional Court upheld the decision to impeach President Park Geun-hye and removed her from office. As a result, Hwang continued as Acting President of South Korea until new elections in early May, which were brought forward from December due to the constitution requiring new elections within 60 days of a permanent presidential vacancy. On assuming the powers of the presidency, Hwang said he felt "deep responsibility". The exact extent of Hwang's powers as acting president are unclear under South Korean law.

His first field tour as acting president was to the Joint Chiefs of Staff in central Seoul, where he emphasized national security and stated "We are facing a grave security status, as we cannot entirely rule out the possibility of North Korean provocations near the Northern Limit Line (NLL)."

Hwang decided against contesting the South Korean 2017 presidential election, declaring it would be inappropriate to run, opting instead to focus on his position as Acting President. He was previously seen as the leading candidate for conservatives within the country, leaving them searching for a viable candidate other than Hwang to challenge leading contender Moon Jae-in for the presidency.

He resigned as Prime Minister on May 11, 2017, after the election of his successor as president.

Post-presidency and party leadership (2018–2020) 
In November 2018, Hwang joined the Liberty Korea Party. He announced in January 2019 that he would be seeking the party's leadership position. On February 27, 2019, he won Liberty Korea Party leadership election with 50.1 percent of the vote. When the Liberty Korea Party merged with several other smaller parties to form the United Future Party on 17 February 2020, Hwang assumed the role of party leader of the United Future Party.

In the 2020 legislative elections on April 15, Hwang ran for the seat for the Jongno district of Seoul, which includes the Blue House and Gwanghwamun Plaza. Hwang led his party to a landslide defeat and lost his own Jongno election to Democratic Party candidate and former Prime Minister Lee Nak-yon. Hwang resigned from the leadership on April 15, shortly after the election. After the 2020 legislative elections, Hwang went on a brief hiatus from politics.

2022 presidential election bid (2021) 
On 10 March 2021, Hwang Kyo-ahn announced his candidacy in the 2022 South Korean presidential election in a Facebook post. He registered as a candidate for the People Power Party, the current incarnation of the former United Future Party. On 8 October, Hwang was eliminated from the PPP shortlist of nominees as it narrowed to four candidates, effectively ending his 2022 presidential bid. After his loss, Hwang engaged in conspiracy theory and accused the primaries of being fraudulent and rigged.

Personal life 
Hwang is a devout Protestant and attends a Baptist church. He is a member of the Korea Baptist Convention. Hwang attended night seminary and has been a church preacher.

References

External links
President Trump and Acting President Hwang Kyo-Ahn of the Republic of Korea (ROK), January 29, 2017
 

|-

1957 births
Living people
Acting presidents of South Korea
Prime Ministers of South Korea
Justice ministers of South Korea
20th-century South Korean lawyers
Sungkyunkwan University alumni
People from Seoul
South Korean Baptists
Changwon Hwang clan
South Korean prosecutors
People Power Party (South Korea) politicians
Liberty Korea Party politicians
21st-century South Korean politicians
21st-century South Korean lawyers